Bob the Builder: The Album is the debut album of Bob the Builder, the fictional character from the BBC children's television series of the same name. Bob is voiced by actor Neil Morrissey.

It features the two UK number one singles "Can We Fix It?" and "Mambo No. 5".

Track listing 
 "Can We Fix It?"
 "Mambo No. 5"
 "Bob's Line Dance"
 "Right Tool for the Job"
 "Let's Get Busy"
 "What Can I Be (Spud's Song)"
 "Blonde Haired Gal in a Hard Hat (Wendy's Song)"
 "Dizzy!"
 "Super Spud (Spud's Dub)"
 "No One Can Dig It Like We Do"
 "No Prob Bob"
 "Crocodile Rock" - Bob the Builder & Elton John

Personnel 
Neil Morrissey - lead and backing vocals, voices of Bob, Roley, Lofty, Farmer Pickles and Scruffty
Kate Harbour - backing vocals, voices of Wendy, Dizzy, Mrs. Potts, Mrs. Percival and Pilchard
Rob Rackstraw - backing vocals, voices of Scoop, Muck, Spud, Travis and Mr. Bentley
Neol Davies - additional backing vocals
Paul Holmes - additional backing vocals
Kathy Staley - additional backing vocals
Pete Simpson - additional backing vocals
Mike Ward - additional backing vocals
Shaun Ward - additional backing vocals, additional programming (tracks 6, 7)
Grant Mitchell - additional backing vocals, keyboards, bass, drum programming, guitar, production
Graham Dickson - additional backing vocals, recording, mixing, guitar (track 9), milk bottles (track 7)
Kevin Browne - guitar (tracks 1, 4, 11)
Paul Joyce - production, keyboards, drums, guitars
Adam Drake - guitar (tracks 6, 7, 8, 10)
Simon Woodgate - keyboards, bass, drum programming (track 4)
Elton John - guest vocals, piano, keyboards (track 12)
Gus Dudgeon - additional vocals (track 12)

Charts

Weekly charts

Year-end charts

References

External links 
 Bob the Builder: The Album at Amazon.co.uk

2001 debut albums
Bob the Builder albums
Bob the Builder